A Gathering of Old Men is a 1987 American-German television drama film directed by Volker Schlöndorff and based on the novel of the same name. It was screened in the Un Certain Regard section at the 1987 Cannes Film Festival. The film was released as television film in the US. For his performance actor Louis Gossett Jr. was nominated at the Emmy Awards for "Outstanding lead actor in a miniseries or a special".

Plot
A bigoted white farmer is shot in self-defense on a Louisiana sugarcane plantation. A group of old black men come forward en masse to take responsibility for the killing. As the sheriff confronts the suspects, the young plantation owner stands firm in her defense of the old men.

Cast
 Louis Gossett Jr. as Mathu
 Richard Widmark as Sheriff Mapes
 Holly Hunter as Candy Marshall
 Joe Seneca as Clatoo
 Will Patton as Lou Dimes
 Woody Strode as Yank
 Tiger Haynes as Booker
 Papa John Creach as Jacob
 Julius Harris as Coot
 Rosanna Carter as Beulah
 Walter Breaux as Charlie
 Joe 'Flash' Riley as Jameson (as Jay 'Flash' Riley)
 Danny Barker as Chimley
 Howard 'Sandman' Sims as Uncle Billy
 Michael Audley ss Uncle Jack Marshall
 P. Jay Sidney as Gable
 Rod Masterson as Couch

Accolades 
1987 Cannes Film Festival - Un Certain Regard

Emmy Awards - Nominated -  Outstanding lead actor in a miniseries or a special - Louis Gossett Jr.

References

External links
 

1987 television films
1987 films
1987 drama films
CBS network films
1980s English-language films
Films about race and ethnicity
Films about racism
Films based on American novels
Films directed by Volker Schlöndorff
American drama television films
1980s American films